The Kapandji score is a tool useful for assessing the opposition of the thumb, based on where on their hand the patient is able to touch with the tip of their thumb.

Scoring

References

Orthopedic clinical prediction rules
Musculoskeletal examination